The ruby-throated bulbul (Rubigula dispar), or yellow bulbul, is a member of the bulbul family of passerine birds. It is found on Sumatra, Java, and Bali.

Taxonomy and systematics

The ruby-throated bulbul was originally described in the genus Turdus and later moved to genus Pycnonotus. Pycnonotus was found to be polyphyletic  in recent molecular phylogenetic studies and five bulbul species, including the ruby-throated bulbul, moved to Rubigula.   Until 2008, the ruby-throated bulbul was considered as conspecific with the black-capped, black-crested, flame-throated and Bornean bulbuls. Some authorities have considered the ruby-throated bulbul to be a subspecies of the black-capped bulbul.

Description

It is virtually crestless, has a deep red throat and reddish eyes.

Distribution and habitat

This is a bird of forest and dense scrub.

Behaviour and ecology

It builds its nest in a bush; two to four eggs are a typical clutch. The ruby-throated bulbul feeds on fruit and insects.

References

Rasmussen, P.C., and J.C. Anderton. (2005). Birds of South Asia. The Ripley Guide. Volume 2: Attributes and Status. Smithsonian Institution and Lynx Edicions, Washington D.C. and Barcelona

ruby-throated bulbul
Birds of Sumatra
Birds of Java
Birds of Bali
ruby-throated bulbul